"Attack Me With Your Love" is a song by Cameo. Released as a single from their album Single Life, the single was released on February 15, 1985. It became a top 5 R&B hit and a top 40 Dance hit in America.

Chart positions

Music video
The music video for "Attack Me with Your Love" was set in New York City and included appearances by Debbi Morgan, Spike Lee, Savion Glover, Maurice Hines, and Laurence Fishburne.

References

Cameo (band) songs
1985 singles
1985 songs
Songs written by Larry Blackmon